Convolvulus socotranus is a species of plant in the family Convolvulaceae. It is endemic to Socotra.  Its natural habitat is subtropical or tropical dry shrubland.

Musty and brown in colouration, the plant is tough and hardgoing, allowing it to flourish in dry shrublands.

References

Endemic flora of Socotra
fastigiata
Vulnerable plants
Taxonomy articles created by Polbot
Taxobox binomials not recognized by IUCN